Crash is the second album by Christian hard rock band Decyfer Down and the first album to feature current lead vocalist TJ Harris.

Background 
On July 7, 2008, Decyfer Down uploaded their first single and title track to their MySpace player. On September 30, 2008, a three track EP titled, "Crash - Digital EP" was released onto iTunes, Amazon, and other digital retailers. The EP contained the songs, "Crash", "Best I Can", and "Now I'm Alive". It was also announced that the band's lead vocalist, Caleb Oliver, had left due to personal reasons.

In late October 2008, TJ Harris joined the band as the new lead vocalist. The second single "Fading" was released to radio on January 28, 2009. On February 17, 2009, Decyfer Down released an updated EP titled, "Crash - EP". The EP contained the songs, "Crash", "Fading", and "Moving On". The album leaked in full a month before its release date on April 1, 2009. Although not included on the album as a whole, "Now I'm Alive" is downloadable on iTunes as a bonus track on the record.

The song "Crash" was featured in promotional videos to hype the Matt Hardy vs. Jeff Hardy match taking place on WWE's WrestleMania XXV pay-per-view, which aired on various WWE programming in the preceding weeks as well as at the event itself. "Forever With You" was featured on a promo for One Life to Live.

The third single, after "Crash" and "Fading", was announced to be "Desperate", which recently peaked at #1 on the Christian Rock chart, making it their seventh consecutive number-one single.  The album has been nominated at the 52nd Grammy Awards for Best Rock Gospel Album.

Track listing

Personnel

Main artists 
TJ Harris – Lead Vocals, Backing Vocals, Bass Guitar, Acoustic Guitars 
Chris Clonts –  Lead Guitars, Rhythm Guitars, Backing Vocals 
Brandon Mills – Rhythm Guitars, Lead Guitars, Backing Vocals, Synth 
Josh Oliver – Drums, Percussion

Additional musicians 
 Caleb Oliver – Founding Member- Lead vocalist/ bassist End of Grey Lead singer and background vocals as well as bassist. Recorded Bass Guitar on 8 songs of the Crash album, in addition to co-writing. Also recorded Lead Vocals and Backing Vocals on Crash - Digital EP, and Backing Vocals on the song "Fading".

Awards

In 2010, the album was nominated for a Dove Award for Rock Album of the Year at the 41st GMA Dove Awards.

References

2009 albums
Decyfer Down albums